The XXII Constitutional Government of Portugal was the 22nd cabinet of the Portuguese government since the establishment of the current constitution. It was established on 26 October 2019 as a Socialist Party (PS) minority government led by Prime Minister António Costa, and ended on 30 March 2022.

Composition

References

External links 
Official website (Portuguese)

2019 establishments in Portugal
Cabinets established in 2019
Constitutional Governments of Portugal
António Costa